Udo Poser (born 21 August 1947) is a German former swimmer. He competed at the 1968 and 1972 Summer Olympics and won a bronze medal in the 4 × 100 m freestyle relay in 1972 by swimming for the East Germany team in the preliminary round. He finished in fifth and sixth place in the 4 × 100 m freestyle relay in 1968 and in the 4 × 200 m freestyle relay in 1972, respectively, whereas individually he failed to reach the finals in the 200 m and 400 m freestyle.

He competed at two European championships in 1966 and 1970 and earned eight medals, including three gold medals, and set one world record in the 4 × 100 m freestyle relay in 1970. Between 1969 and 1971 he won six national titles in the 100 m and 200 m butterfly events.

References

1947 births
Living people
People from Hildburghausen
German male swimmers
German male freestyle swimmers
German male butterfly swimmers
Olympic swimmers of East Germany
Swimmers at the 1968 Summer Olympics
Swimmers at the 1972 Summer Olympics
European Aquatics Championships medalists in swimming
Medalists at the 1972 Summer Olympics
Olympic bronze medalists for East Germany
Sportspeople from Thuringia